Catoptria speculalis is a species of moth in the family Crambidae. It is found in France, Germany, Austria, Switzerland, Italy and Bosnia and Herzegovina. It is extinct in Great Britain, where it was formerly known from the Scottish Highlands.

The wingspan is 22–29 mm.

References

Moths described in 1825
Crambini
Moths of Europe